1505 Koranna is an asteroid.

Koranna may also refer to:
 Koranna people
 Koranna language
 Koranna (cicada), a genus of cicadas

See also 
Korana (disambiguation)